The Indian state of Telangana has a significant amount of software export in India. While the majority of the industry is concentrated in Hyderabad,  other cities are also becoming significant IT destinations in the state. Hyderabad houses the largest campuses of tech giants like Google, Facebook, Microsoft, Amazon, and Apple outside of the US. In Hyderabad, the central region of the business happens in Financial District, HITECH City , the Madhapur suburb , Kokapet SEZ (Neopolis) and Salarpuria Sattva Knowledge City. As of 2022, Hyderabad has 7,78,121 employees in the IT/ITES sector, working in more than 1500 companies. The number of startups in Telangana had increased from 400 in 2016 to 2,000 in 2022. Hyderabad added two companies in unicorn startup list in first two months of 2022.

The IT exports from Hyderabad (Telangana) stood second in India at ₹183,569  crore (US$23 billion) in FY 2021–22 improving from previous year. IT sector exports from Telangana account for 50 per cent of total exports from state. Telangana contributed to over 11 per cent of India’s IT exports.

History 
The initiation of this Software Industry in Hyderabad was started after Satyam Computer Services Ltd was founded in 1987 by brothers, Rama Raju and Ramalinga Raju (henceforth Raju) 

During the tenure of Rajiv Gandhi as prime minister with a motive of giving Hyderabad a start in Information Technology and Exports, the project was initiated by APIIC during tenure of Nedurumalli Janardhan Reddy as Chief Minister of Andhra Pradesh along with participation of private infrastructure companies like L&T, Raheja corporation, Ascendas IT Park, Vanenburg Corporation, Peepul Capital (successor to iLabs Venture Capital Fund), SP, RMZ corporation, Divyasree infrastructure, Lanco hills technology park, DLF, Emaar MGF and others. The area comprises IT parks such as L&T Infocity, Hitech City 2 , Tech Mahindra IT SEZ, TCS Synergy park IT SEZ, SEZs of Infosys, Wipro SEZ, Vanenburg IT Park or The V, Mindspace Cyberabad SEZ, DLF IT SEZ and APIIC , built to suit campuses of several major technology companies. Later Chief Ministers of Andhra Pradesh/Telangana N Chandrababu Naidu , YS Rajashekar Reddy , K Chandrashekar Rao initiated different developmental activities in Hyderabad IT industry

The Hyderabad Information Technology and Engineering Consultancy City, abbreviated as HITEC City, is an Indian Information Technology, Engineering, Health informatics, and Bioinformatics; business district located in Hyderabad. HITEC City is spread across 200 acres of land under suburbs of Madhapur, Gachibowli, Kondapur, Manikonda, and Nanakramguda, the technology township is also known as Cyberabad. HITEC City is within two kilometers of the residential and commercial suburb of Jubilee Hills.

HITEC City was commissioned by Larsen and Toubro Limited through its Special Purpose Vehicle, L&T Hitech City Limited, a joint venture company of L&T Infocity Limited and erstwhile Andhra Pradesh Industrial Infrastructure Corporation.

The project is spread over 300 acres of land and was envisaged to develop around 11,000,000 sq ft . of IT space and around 4,500,000 sq ft. of residential space in a phased manner. The Project offers multi tenanted as well as Built-to-suit (BTS) facilities. It caters to all segments of the IT Industry including small & medium enterprises, with office areas starting from as small as around 2,500 sq ft .

Nanakramguda Financial District

Nanakramguda Financial District is an IT, real estate and architectural suburb in Gachibowli, Hyderabad. WaveRock is a  2.5 million square feet (sqft) Information Technology-Special Economic Zone (IT-SEZ) in Nanakramguda spread over 12 acres (approx). WaveRock SEZ houses over 25 IT companies including marquee clients such as Apple, GAP, Accenture, Development Bank of Singapore, DuPont among others, and has close to 25,000 to 30,000 employees working out of the premises. In December 2019, WaveRock was bought by the Shapoorji Pallonji Real Estate Fund (SPREF II) for Rs 1,800 crore from Tishman Speyer.

HITEC City 

The IT industry got a major push By N. Chandrababu Naidu setting up  Larsen & Toubro with policy maker APIIC built a special economic zone called Hyderabad Information Technology Engineering Consultancy City or simply HITEC City. It started the era of Software & IT in Hyderabad.

Salarpuria Sattva Knowledge City

Salarpuria Sattva Knowledge City is a 7.5 million sft IT park spread across 30 acres and 5 megatowers. It is home to global behemoths like JP Morgan, Intel, Microsoft, Goldman Sachs, Novartis Healthcare, Synchrony Financial, AMD and KPMG. The Bengaluru-based builder , Salarpuria Sattva  partnered with Blackstone recently to develop a 7 million sq ft IT park in Hyderabad. T-Hub and T-Works are prominent buildings in its vicinity.

Kokapet SEZ (Neopolis) 

Kokapet SEZ (Neopolis) is almost an extension of Financial District. Hyderabad-based My Home Group is firming up plans for a 30-35 million sq feet project at a cost of around $2 billion at Kokapet to build one of the largest private IT parks in India.

IT Industry in Warangal 
	
In February 2016, Telangana IT Minister K. T. Rama Rao laid the foundation stone for IT incubation centre at Madikonda, Warangal. In January 2020, two major companies namely Tech Mahindra and Cyient have inaugurated their campuses employing about 2,000 people. Softpath, Quadrant started their operations in the Warangal IT Tower/Incubation Centre.

See also 

 Information technology in India
 Software industry in Karnataka
 List of Indian IT companies

References 

Economy of Hyderabad, India
Economy of Telangana
Software industry in India
Information technology industry of Chennai
Software companies of India
Software
Information technology organisations based in India